Celts and Cobras is the second and final studio album from the Scottish neo-rockabilly group The Shakin' Pyramids (billed on the album cover as "Shakin' Pyramids"), released in 1982 by Cuba Libre, a subsidiary of Virgin Records. "Just a Memory" and "Pharaoh's Chant" were released as singles from the album. It features a more diverse instrumental palette than the band's debut album, Skin 'Em Up (1981), but was seen as a departure from the group's original, immediate sound.

Reception 

Celts and Cobras features more varied instrumentation than previous Shakin' Pyramids releases, but was seen as a departure from the band's original, immediate sound. Trouser Press said, "Celts and Cobras offers a higher percentage of their own songs, but on it they're accompanied by piano, accordion, electric bass and even — gack! — a string section... The band still rocks, but they'd better figure out where they're going." AllMusic gave the album 3/5 stars, and opined that "the energy and verve of their debut had been replaced by a stultifying maturity." Ethnomusicologist Craig Morrison wrote, "[Celts and Cobras] drifted farther from rockabilly as they broadened their horizons... One writer asked, "From neo-rockabilly to neo-schlock—is this neo-progress?"

Track listing 
Side A:

Side B:

Personnel

The Shakin' Pyramids
Davie Duncan – Lead vocals, drums, percussion, tambourine
James G. Creighton – Acoustic and electric guitar, acoustic bass, mandolin, background vocals
"Railroad" Ken McLellan – Acoustic guitar, background vocals

Additional Personnel
Bob Andrews: Piano, electric bass
Geraint Watkins: Accordion
Mitch Caws: Slap bass
John Willoughby: Upright bass
Andy Powell, Paul Hughes: Electric bass
Strings arranged by Roy Clark

References 

1982 albums
The Shakin' Pyramids albums